Sir Nicholas Brian Baker (23 November 1938 – 25 April 1997) was a British Conservative Member of Parliament and government minister.

He was educated at Clifton College and Oxford University. After unsuccessfully contesting the safe Labour seat of Peckham in February and October 1974, he represented the parliamentary constituency of North Dorset from 1979 until 1997. He was married to Carol d'Abo, sister of musician & broadcaster Mike d'Abo, and they adopted a son Matthew and a daughter Annabel.

He was also a Home Office junior minister under Michael Howard. In this role, he was involved in blocking Mohamed Al-Fayed's long-running attempts to attain British citizenship and in the widely publicized reprieve of a dog called Dempsey which had been threatened with death under the Dangerous Dogs Act 1991.

Health problems caused Baker to resign his ministerial post, and he announced that he would not re-stand for his parliamentary seat at the 1997 general election. He died shortly before the election, having been knighted during the final weeks of his life.

References

External links 
 

1938 births
1997 deaths
Knights Bachelor
Conservative Party (UK) MPs for English constituencies
UK MPs 1983–1987
UK MPs 1979–1983
UK MPs 1987–1992
UK MPs 1992–1997
People educated at Clifton College
Politicians awarded knighthoods